Frederick Dobson may refer to:

 Frederick William Dobson (1886–1935), English recipient of the Victoria Cross
 Frederick Dobson (cricketer) (1898–1980), English cricketer
 F.A. Dobson (1866–1948), American cinematographer